Lofton is a surname and occasionally a given name. Notable people with the name include:

Surname
 Cirroc Lofton (born 1978), American actor
 Chris Lofton (born 1986), American basketball player
 Christopher L Lofton (born 1987), American performance poet, writer and artist
 Curtis Lofton (born 1986), American football linebacker
 David Lofton (born 1984), American football safety
 Eric Lofton (born 1993), Canadian football offensive lineman
 James Lofton (born 1956), former American Football wide receiver and coach
 James Lofton (baseball) (born 1974), former Major League Baseball shortstop
 John Lofton (1941–2014), American political commentator
 Kenneth Lofton Jr. (born 2002), American basketball player
 Kenny Lofton (born 1967), Major League Baseball outfielder
 Oscar Lofton (born 1938), American football player and coach
 Ramona Lofton (born 1950), nicknamed Sapphire African-American author and performance poet
 Saab Lofton, American author, cartoonist and radio personality
 Steve Lofton (born 1968), American football cornerback
 Tricky Lofton (born 1930), American jazz trombonist
 Willie Lofton (born 1905), American Blues musician

Given name
 Lofton R. Henderson (1903–1942), American naval aviator

See also 
 Lofton Creek Records, an American country music record label
 Loftin